was a Japanese shōnen manga magazine published in Japan by Kadokawa Shoten. It directly focused on the Sgt. Frog series and other works promoted by Bandai such as Gundam. The magazine contained manga comics, computer game reviews, merchandise promotions and gifts.

Focus
The magazine focused primarily on the series Sgt. Frog, containing features, promotions and a new manga. The manga saw Keroro and his allies sent to an alien world which resembles feudal Japan. They are tasked with attempting to bring order to it.

The magazine's secondary focus was Gundam. Similar to Sgt. Frog, the magazine contained much promotion of its related merchandise and four of the comics running were Gundam titles. These included an adaptation of the television series Mobile Suit Gundam 00, latest chapters of SD Gundam and GPEX Gunpla Extreme, in which humans use special gadgets to shrink down and turn Gundam models into working miniature mecha.

The remainder of titles printed in the magazine alternated between comedy adventure gag comics and further promotional tie ins.

Titles
These manga series were carried by the magazine.
 .hack//Link 
 Angler Hero
 Appare! Tonomaru-kun
 Battle Spirits Series
 BB Senshi Romance of the Three Kingdoms: Clash of the Heroes Chapter (SD Gundam)
 Cardfight!! Vanguard
 Chō Seiki α
 Code Geass: Tales of an Alternate Shogunate
 Daikaijū Battle: Ultra Adventure
 Dragon Tamer Sound Spirit F
 GPEX Gunpla Extreme
 Keroro Gunsō Tokubetsu Kunren: Sengoku Ran Star Dai Battle!
 Kung-fu-kun
 MapleStory
 Mobile Suit Gundam-san
 Mobile Suit Gundam 00
 Mugen no Frontier: Super Robot Wars OG Saga
 Net Ghost PiPoPa
 Petit Eva Bokura Tanken Dōkōkai
 Saint Seiya Omega
 Sore Ike! Momotarō Dentetsu
 Sgt. Frog
 Soulcalibur Legends
 Treasure Island Z: The Rose Pearl

Connection to other publications
Due to its role of promoting Bandai projects, the title was linked to similar magazines such as Hobby Japan and Dengeki Hobby. The title also included popular comics which run in Gundam Ace; it was also a special edition of Gundam Ace.

Gifts
Similar to many Shonen magazines (Shonen Ace, Monthly Shonen Sunday), Kerokero Ace often included 'gifts' to increase interest. Such items were usually linked to the comics that ran within the title or exclusive collectables. Items offered included Haro digital watches, Keroro stickers and kaiju trading cards.

External links
Kerokero Ace Official Site 

2007 establishments in Japan
2013 disestablishments in Japan
Defunct magazines published in Japan
Monthly manga magazines published in Japan
Kadokawa Shoten magazines
Magazines established in 2007
Magazines disestablished in 2013
Shōnen manga magazines